is a Japanese swimmer, who specialized in butterfly events. He represented his nation Japan at the 2008 Summer Olympics and has won a career total of three medals (one silver and two bronze) in a major international competition, spanning the Asian Games, Pan Pacific Championships, and Summer Universiade. Shibata also established both his personal best and Japanese techsuit-era record of 1:51.30 at the 2007 FINA World Cup in Singapore, until it was finally smashed by Hidemasa Sano at the Japan Swimming Open in 2010. Shibata is a student at Nihon University in Tokyo.

In 2006, Shibata won a bronze medal in the 200 m butterfly at the Asian Games in Doha, Qatar (1:56.44), and a silver at the Pan Pacific Swimming Championships in Victoria, British Columbia, Canada (1:55.82), finishing behind American swimmer and world-record holder Michael Phelps.

Shibata competed for the Japanese squad in the men's 200 m butterfly at the 2008 Summer Olympics in Beijing. Leading up to the Games, he cleared a FINA A-standard entry time of 1:55.57 at the Olympic Trials in Tokyo. Moreover, Shibata's surprising triumph dashed the hopes of two-time Olympic medalist Takashi Yamamoto, who finished behind him in third and thereby missed out on his fourth Olympic bid. Despite entering the semifinals with an eleventh-seeded time of 1:55.82 from the evening prelims, Shibata tried to command his lead over all-time Olympian Michael Phelps at the final turn of the race, but faded down the stretch to hit the wall in seventh position and twelfth overall. Shibata's semifinal mark of 1:56.17 was not worthy enough to advance him further to the top 8 final.

References

External links
NBC 2008 Olympics profile

1983 births
Living people
Olympic swimmers of Japan
Swimmers at the 2008 Summer Olympics
Swimmers at the 2006 Asian Games
Asian Games medalists in swimming
Japanese male butterfly swimmers
Sportspeople from Fukuoka (city)
Asian Games bronze medalists for Japan
Medalists at the 2006 Asian Games
Universiade medalists in swimming
Universiade bronze medalists for Japan
Medalists at the 2005 Summer Universiade
21st-century Japanese people